Omorgus tomentosus is a beetle of the family Trogidae.

References 

tomentosus
Beetles described in 1941